Xindian District is an inner city district in the southern part of New Taipei City, Taiwan.

Name
Xindian's name originated during the Qing Dynasty close to 300 years ago. According to legend, a person named Lin and others came from Quanzhou, Fujian Province. On a mountain road leading to Wulai, they built a small cabin and opened a store selling groceries for the exchange of goods with mountain aborigines. Since the store had no formal name, travelers called it Sintiam.

An area usually not considered as part of Xindian is Ankeng, although it is within the jurisdiction of the district, located in a valley on the west side of the Xindian Creek. It was originally called Amkhe'ar, due to luxurious vegetation in the area. However, it was later decided to be indecent and the name was changed to Ankeng.

History

Empire of Japan

Republic of China
The Kuomintang government moved the seat of government (in exile) of Fujian Province to Xindian from 1956 to 1996. Although in 1980, it was still underdeveloped, the four-lane Zhongxing Road helped to develop the city, While areas south of Xiaobitan were still farmland. After Freeway 3 opened, parks along Xiaobitan and Xindian Creek gave way to development. With the opening of the Taipei Metro, more commercial development and businesses have come into the area. In 2004 when the Tzu Chi Hospital branch opened, a new road was constructed to deal with traffic.

Originally established as urban township of Taipei County, Xindian was upgraded to a county-administered city on 15 January 1980. After Taipei County was upgraded to New Taipei City on 25 December 2010, Xindian City became a district.

Geography

Xindian is located on the south side of the Taipei Basin, mainly on the plains between the Xindian Creek, its tributaries, and the mountains (the Xueshan Range). The Nanshi River merges with the Beishi River in Xindian, forming the Xindian Creek, one of the major tributaries of the Tamsui River. The Xindian Creek generally flows from south to north, dividing the city into east and west sides of the creek. Although the western side (Ankeng) covers a larger area, residential, administrative, commercial, and transportation centers are all on the eastern side of the creek at Dapinglin (大坪林). Most of the population in the Ankeng region is mainly concentrated in the southeastern hillside residential communities.

The district is located in southern New Taipei City. To the north is the Wenshan District of Taipei City and the Jingmei River, to the east it borders the district of Shiding, to the south it borders the district of Wulai, and to the west it borders the district of Sanxia. Compared to other districts in New Taipei City, Xindian is more influenced by Taipei City; the Taipei Metro extends into Xindian, via the Xindian Line and Xiaobitan Branch Line. Five Metro stations are located in Xindian: Xiaobitan; Dapinglin; Qizhang; Xindian District Office; and the main Xindian Metro station. Feitsui Dam is also located in the district.

Xindian has many traditional markets that have decades of history. The New Taipei City Police Department has ten divisions in Xindian.

Administrative divisions
Xindian is divided into 69 villages (里), then further divided in 1,447 neighborhoods (鄰).

Government agencies
 Architecture and Building Research Institute
 National Airborne Service Corps
 National Fire Agency
 National Science and Technology Center for Disaster Reduction
 Ministry of Justice Investigation Bureau
 Taiwan Transportation Safety Board

Education

Universities
 Jinwen University of Science and Technology

Vocational schools
 Cardinal Tien College of Healthcare and Management
 Kaiming Senior Vocational School
 Nanqiang Senior Vocational School
 Zhuangjing Senior Vocational School
 Nengren Home Economics Vocational School

High schools
New Taipei Municipal An Kang High School
New Taipei Municipal Hsin Tien Senior High School
Chi Jen Private High School (Private)
Our Lady Of Providence Girls' High School (Private)
Kang Chiao International School (Private)

Junior high schools
Da Guan Junior High School
An Kang High School
Chi Jen Private High School (Private)
Our Lady Of Providence Girls' High School (Private)
Kang Chiao International School (Private)
Wenshan Junior High School
Wu Feng Junior High School

Elementary school
Sindian Elementary School
Jhihtan Elementary School
Gueishan Elementary School
Chung Cheng Elementary School
Qing-Tan Elementary School
Da-Feng Elementary School
Quchi Elementary School
Ankeng Elementary School
Shuangcheng Elementary School
Beihsin Elementary School
Shuang Feng Elementary School
Hsin He Elementary School
Kang Chiao International School (Private)
Da Guan Elementary School

Tourist attractions

 Bitan
 Bitan Bridge (碧潭橋)
 Xindian Ferry Pier
 Sunshine Sports Park (陽光運動公園)
 Xiaobitan Park (小碧潭公園)
 Qinqing Riverside Park (親情河濱公園)
 Liugong Park
 Xindian Old Street (新店老街)
 Jing-Mei White Terror Memorial Park
 Zhongyang villages (中央新村)
 Feicui Reservoir (翡翠水庫)
 Xindian River
 Xiaobitan (小碧潭)
 Erbazi Botanical Garden (二叭子植物園)
 Xindian History Museum (新店文史館)
 Lion's Head Mountain (獅頭山)
 Little Lion's Head Mountain (小獅頭山)
 Chen Feng-hsien Miniature Sculpture Museum (陳逢顯毫芒雕刻博物館)

Transportation

Taipei Metro
Xindian metro station
Xindian District Office metro station
Qizhang metro station
Shisizhang station
Dapinglin metro station
Xiaobitan metro station

Ankeng light rail 
Shuangcheng light rail station
Rose China Town light rail station
Taipei Xiaocheng light rail station
Cardinal Tien Hospital Ankang Branch light rail station
Jinwen University of Science and Technology light rail station
Ankang light rail station
Sunshine Sports Park light rail station
Xinhe Elementary School light rail station
Shisizhang station

National Highway No. 3 can also be reached via the district.

Sister cities 
 Tavares, Florida, USA (2010)
 Flagstaff, Arizona, USA
 Tongeren, Belgium

Notable natives
 Serena Liu, former actress
 Shu Qi, actress
 Wang Yung-tsai, industrialist

Galleries

See also

 New Taipei City

References

External links 

  
Xindian City Government Website  (Archive)

Districts of New Taipei